The 1985 SWAC men's basketball tournament was held March 8–9, 1985, at the Mississippi Coast Coliseum in Biloxi, Mississippi. Southern defeated , 85–70 in the championship game. The Jaguars received the conference's automatic bid to the 1985 NCAA tournament as No. 16 seed in the West Region.

Bracket and results

References

1984–85 Southwestern Athletic Conference men's basketball season
SWAC men's basketball tournament